Malvella leprosa is a species of flowering plant in the mallow family known by the common names alkali mallow and alkali sida. It is native to much of the western United States, Mexico, Argentina, and Chile. It is known in parts of Australia as an introduced species. In many regions, whether native there or not, the plant is often a noxious weed and easily invades habitat, including areas with alkaline and saline soils. In California, the plant can be found in agricultural lands, including fields and orchards. Leaves appear in the leaf axils singly or in clusters of up to 3. The disc-shaped fruit is divided into several segments.

External links
Jepson Manual Treatment
USDA Plants Profile
Weeds Australia
Photo gallery

Malveae
Flora of Argentina
Flora of Chile
Flora of Mexico
Flora of the Western United States
Flora of California
Flora without expected TNC conservation status